Egypt–United Kingdom relations are the diplomatic, economic, and cultural relationships between Egypt and Great Britain. Relations are longstanding. They involve politics, defence, trade and education, and especially issues regarding the Suez Canal.

History

British rule

The first period of British rule (1882–1914) was the "veiled protectorate". During this time the Khedivate of Egypt remained an autonomous province of the Ottoman Empire. In reality the British made all the decisions and thus had a de facto protectorate over the country. This state of affairs lasted until the Ottoman Empire joined the First World War on the side of the Central Powers in November 1914 and Britain unilaterally declared a protectorate over Egypt. The Ottomans thereby lost all connections.  The ruling khedive was deposed and his successor, Hussein Kamel, was compelled to declare himself Sultan of Egypt independent of the Ottomans in December 1914.

Seizure of Egypt, 1882
As co-owners of the Suez Canal, both British and French governments had strong interests in the stability of Egypt. Over two-thirds of the traffic was by British merchant ships and it was the gateway to India and the Far East. However, in 1881 the ʻUrabi revolt broke out-- it was a nationalist movement led by Ahmed ʻUrabi (1841–1911) against the administration of Khedive Tewfik, who collaborated closely with the British and French. Combined with the complete turmoil in Egyptian finances, the threat to the Suez Canal, and embarrassment to British prestige if it could not handle a revolt, London found the situation intolerable and decided to end it by force. The French, however, did not join in. On 11 July 1882, Gladstone ordered the bombardment of Alexandria which launched the short decisive short, Anglo-Egyptian War of 1882. Egypt nominally remained under the sovereignty of the Ottoman Empire, and France and other nations had representation, but British officials made the decisions. The dominant personality was Evelyn Baring, 1st Earl of Cromer. He was thoroughly familiar with the British Raj in India, and applied similar policies to take full control of the Egyptian economy. London 66 times promised to depart in a few years; the actual result was British control of Egypt for four decades, largely ignoring the Ottoman Empire.

Historian A.J.P. Taylor says that the seizure of Egypt "was a great event; indeed, the only real event in international relations between the Battle of Sedan and the defeat of Russia in the Russo-Japanese war."
Taylor emphasizes long-term impact:

Gladstone and the Liberals had a reputation for strong opposition to imperialism, so historians have long debated the explanation for this reversal of policy. The most influential was a study by John Robinson and Ronald Gallagher, Africa and the Victorians (1961). They focused on The Imperialism of Free Trade and promoted the highly influential Cambridge School of historiography. They argue there was no long-term Liberal plan in support of imperialism. Instead they saw the urgent necessity to act to protect the Suez Canal in the face of what appeared to be a radical collapse of law and order, and a nationalist revolt focused on expelling the Europeans, regardless of the damage it would do to international trade and the British Empire. Gladstone's decision came against strained relations with France, and maneuvering by "men on the spot" in Egypt. Critics such as Cain and Hopkins have stressed the need to protect large sums invested by British financiers and Egyptian bonds, while downplaying the risk to the viability of the Suez Canal. Unlike the Marxists, they stress "gentlemanly" financial and commercial interests, not the industrial capitalism that Marxists believe was always central.

A.G. Hopkins rejected Robinson and Gallagher's argument, citing original documents to claim that there was no perceived danger to the Suez Canal from the ‘Urabi movement, and that ‘Urabi and his forces were not chaotic "anarchists", but rather maintained law and order.  He alternatively argues that Gladstone's cabinet was motivated by protecting the interests of British bondholders with investments in Egypt as well as by pursuit of domestic political popularity. Hopkins cites the British investments in Egypt that grew massively leading into the 1880s, partially as a result of the Khedive's debt from construction of the Suez Canal, as well as the close links that existed between the British government and the economic sector. He writes that Britain's economic interests occurred simultaneously with a desire within one element of the ruling Liberal Party for a militant foreign policy in order to gain the domestic political popularity that enabled it to compete with the Conservative Party. Hopkins cites a letter from Edward Malet, the British consul general in Egypt at the time, to a member of the Gladstone Cabinet offering his congratulations on the invasion: "You have fought the battle of all Christendom and history will acknowledge it. May I also venture to say that it has given the Liberal Party a new lease of popularity and power."  However, Dan Halvorson argues that the protection of the Suez Canal and British financial and trade interests were secondary and derivative. Instead, the primary motivation was the vindication of British prestige in both Europe and especially in India by suppressing the threat to “civilised” order posed by the Urabist revolt.

Egyptian independence 

In December 1921, the British authorities in Cairo imposed martial law and once again deported Zaghlul. Demonstrations again led to violence.  In deference to the growing nationalism and at the suggestion of the High Commissioner, Lord Allenby, the UK unilaterally declared Egyptian independence on 28 February 1922, abolishing the protectorate and establishing an independent Kingdom of Egypt.  Until the Anglo-Egyptian treaty of 1936, the Kingdom was only nominally independent, since the British retained control of foreign relations, communications, the military and the Anglo-Egyptian Sudan. Between 1936 and 1952, the British continued to maintain military presence and political advisors, at a reduced level.

During World War II, British troops used Egypt as a major base for Allied operations throughout the region.  Egypt was nominally neutral in the war. 

British troops were withdrawn to the Suez Canal area in 1947, but nationalist, anti-British feelings continued to grow after the war. The Egyptian Revolution of 1952 overthrew the Egyptian monarchy, eliminated the British military presence in Egypt, and established the modern Republic of Egypt.

Suez Crisis of 1956

In 1956, Egyptian president Gamal Abdel Nasser nationalized the Suez canal, a vital waterway through which most of Europe's oil arrived from the Middle East. Britain and France, in league with Israel, invaded to seize the canal and overthrow Nasser.  The United States, led by President Dwight D. Eisenhower, strenuously objected, using diplomatic and financial pressure to force the three invaders to withdraw. Prime Minister Anthony Eden was humiliated and soon resigned. Thorpe summarized the unexpected results:

Modern relations

The relations also concern military business. Such as training, visits and access to the Commonwealth War Graves in Heliopolis and El Alamein. Also co-ordination over flights and Suez Canal transits for warships.

According to the 2001 UK Census some 24,700 Egyptian-born people were present in the UK. The Office for National Statistics estimates that the equivalent figure for 2009 was 27,000.

In late 2014, the Egyptian-British Chamber of Commerce (EBCC) released a report detailing the trade volume between the two countries, which increased significantly that year. British exports to Egypt grew by 15%, while Egyptian exports to the UK grew by over 30%. The UK is the largest investor into the Egyptian economy, accounting for 41.3% of total foreign direct investment. The New Suez Canal project and Egypt's economic recovery following three years of turmoil since the 2011 uprising are contributing factors to this achievement.

Diplomatic missions

Egypt's embassy in the United Kingdom is located at 26 South Audley Street, London W1K 1DW.

The United Kingdom's embassy in Egypt is located at 7 Ahmed Ragheb Street, Garden City, Cairo. Outside Cairo, there is a British Consulate-General in Alexandria and an Honorary Consulate in Sharm el Sheik.

The current Egyptian Ambassador to the UK is Sherif Kamel, the British Ambassador to Egypt is Gareth Bayley.

See also

List of Ambassadors from Egypt to the United Kingdom
List of diplomats from the United Kingdom to Egypt
Egyptians in the United Kingdom
Britons in Egypt
Anglo-Egyptian War, of 1882

References
General

Specific

Further reading
 
 Darwin, John. Britain, Egypt and the Middle East: Imperial policy in the aftermath of war, 1918-1922 (1981)
 Hahn, Peter L. The United States, Great Britain, and Egypt, 1945-1956: Strategy and Diplomacy in the Early Cold War (1991) online
 Louis, William Roger. The British Empire in the Middle East, 1945-1951: Arab Nationalism, the United States, and Postwar Imperialism (1984)
 Marlowe, John.  A History of Modern Egypt and Anglo-Egyptian Relations, 1800-1953 (1954) online
 Oren, Michael B. The Origins of the Second Arab-Israel War: Egypt, Israel and the Great Powers, 1952-56 (Routledge, 2013)
 Royal Institute of International Affairs. Great Britain and Egypt, 1914-1951 (2nd ed. 1952)  online free
 Thomas, Martin, and Richard Toye. "Arguing about intervention: a comparison of British and French rhetoric surrounding the 1882 and 1956 invasions of Egypt." Historical Journal 58.4 (2015): 1081-1113 online.
 Thornhill, Michael T. "Informal Empire, Independent Egypt and the Accession of King Farouk." Journal of Imperial and Commonwealth History 38#2 (2010): 279–302.
 Tignore, Robert L. Egypt: A Short History (2011) online

Pre-1914
 Cromer, Earl of. Modern Egypt (2 vol 1908) online a primary source
 Daly, M. W. "The British occupation, 1882-1922 in Daly, ed The Cambridge History of Egypt (Volume 2, 1999) pp  239-251. 
 de Groot, Emile. "Europe and Egypt in the 19th Century" History Today (Jan 1952), Vol. 2 Issue 1, pp 34–44. online
 Deringil, Selim. "The Ottoman Response to the Egyptian Crisis of 1881-82" Middle Eastern Studies (1988) 24#1 pp. 3-24 online
 Gibbons, Herbert Adams. Great Britain in Egypt (1920) Online.
 Harrison, Robert T. Gladstone's Imperialism in Egypt: Techniques of Domination (1995)
 Hopkins, Anthony G. "The Victorians and Africa: a reconsideration of the occupation of Egypt, 1882." Journal of African History 27.2 (1986): 363–391. online
 Huffaker, Shauna. "Representations of Ahmed Urabi: Hegemony, Imperialism, and the British Press, 1881–1882." Victorian Periodicals Review 45.4 (2012): 375–405.

 Knaplund, Paul. Gladstone's Foreign Policy (Harper and Row, 1935) pp 161-248. https://archive.org/details/gladstonesforeig00knap
 Newman, E. W. P. Great Britain in Egypt (1928)  Online.
 Owen, Roger. Lord Cromer: Victorian Imperialist, Edwardian Proconsul (Oxford UP, 2005) Online review, On Egypt 1882–1907.
 Robinson, Ronald Edward, and John Gallagher. Africa and the Victorians: The official mind of imperialism (Macmillan, 1966) pp 76–159 on Gladstone and Suez..
 Savage, Jesse Dillon. "The stability and breakdown of empire: European informal empire in China, the Ottoman Empire and Egypt." European Journal of International Relations 17.2 (2011): 161–185. online
 Symons, M. Travers. Britain and Egypt: The rise of Egyptian nationalism (1925)Online

External links
British links
Official website of the British Embassy in Cairo

Egyptian links
Official website of the Egyptian Embassy in London
Official website of the Egyptian Consulate in London
Official website of the Egyptian Cultural Centre and Educational Bureau in London

 
United Kingdom
Bilateral relations of the United Kingdom